John Samuel Feinberg (born April 2, 1946) is an American theologian, author, and professor of biblical and systematic theology. He is currently listed as Professor of Biblical and Systematic Theology (retired) at Trinity Evangelical Divinity School in Deerfield, Illinois. He is noted for his expertise in theodicy.

Background and education
Feinberg was born in 1946 to Charles Lee and Anne Priscilla (Fraiman) Feinberg in Dallas, Texas. His family moved from Dallas, Texas to Los Angeles, California in 1948 when his father became the first dean of Talbot Theological Seminary. Feinberg earned his Bachelor of Arts degree in English from the University of California at Los Angeles, his Master of Theology degree (1972) in systematic theology from Trinity, and his Master of Arts (1971) and Doctor of Philosophy (1979) degrees from the University of Chicago.

Feinberg lives in Vernon Hills, Illinois, with his wife Patricia, with whom he has three children. His brother Paul David (1938 - 2004) also taught Systematic Theology and Philosophy of Religion at Trinity Evangelical Divinity School for thirty years.

Career
In his early career, Feinberg served as a missionary in Los Angeles on staff for the American Board of Missions to the Jews. He began his teaching career in 1969 at the Los Angeles Bible Training School in Watts, California. Feinberg was ordained to ministry in 1971 and served as pastor of the Elmwood Park Bible Church in Elmwood Park, Illinois, from 1974 to 1976. He resumed teaching in 1976 at Western Conservative Baptist Seminary in Portland, Oregon, before moving in 1981 to teach at Liberty Baptist Seminary and College in Lynchburg, Virginia. In 1983, he joined the faculty of Trinity Evangelical Divinity School.

During the mid-1980s, Feinberg served on the national membership committee of the Evangelical Theological Society, and in 1985 served a term as president of the Evangelical Philosophical Society. Since then, he has authored several books and serves as a theological consultant for the academic division of Crossway Books. He serves as general editor for the series Foundations of Evangelical Theology.

In 2015 a Festschrift was published in his honor. Building on the Foundations of Evangelical Theology: Essays in Honor of John S. Feinberg includes contributions from Kevin Vanhoozer, Bruce A. Ware, and Walter Kaiser Jr.

Selected works

Books

Edited by

Chapters
 - plus his responses

Articles

Festschrift

References

External links
TEDS faculty page
ChristianCourses.com faculty page 

1946 births
Living people
20th-century evangelicals
21st-century evangelicals
American male non-fiction writers
Christian philosophers
Evangelical theologians
Evangelical writers
Jewish American writers
Jewish philosophers
Liberty University faculty
People from Vernon Hills, Illinois
Trinity Evangelical Divinity School alumni
University of California, Los Angeles alumni
University of Chicago alumni
Western Seminary